The Time That Remains is a 2009 semi-biographical drama film written and directed by Palestinian director Elia Suleiman. The film stars Ali Suliman, Elia Suleiman, Saleh Bakri and Samar Qudha Tanus. It gives an account of the creation of the Israeli state from 1948 to the present.  Suleiman participated in the 2009 Cannes Film Festival, as his new film competed in the official selection category. The Time That Remains was also screened at the 2009 Toronto International Film Festival. In November 2009, the film won the Jury Grand Prize (with About Elly) at the Asia Pacific Screen Awards. The film won the Critics Prize of the Argentinian Film Critics Association at Mar del Plata International Film Festival.

Cast 
Ali Suliman - Eliza's Boyfriend
Saleh Bakri - Fuad
Maisa Abd Elhadi - Woman in West Bank taxi
Zidane Awad - The Student
Elia Suleiman - ES
Menashe Noy - Taxi Driver
Izabel Ramadan - Olga
Yasmine Haj - Nadia
Leila Muammar - Thuraya

References

External links
 The Time That Remains at Sundance selects (archived)
 
 
 The Time That Remains at Facebook
 
 The Time That Remains at Metacritic
 The Time That Remains at  Twitter
 
 The Time That Remains on Indiewire
 Overview of The Time That Remains at The New York Times website
 "Israel does Cannes, Tribeca and Jerusalem". Jerusalem Post.
 Elia Suleiman's The Time That Remains

2009 films
2009 black comedy films
Palestinian comedy films
Israeli–Palestinian conflict films
British films based on actual events
Films directed by Elia Suleiman
2009 comedy films
British comedy films
Italian comedy films
Italian films based on actual events
French comedy films
French films based on actual events
Belgian comedy films
2000s British films
2000s French films